Van  railway station is the main railway station in Van, Turkey. Up until July 2015, the Trans-Asia Express, from Tehran, Iran, stopped at the station. The train would continue to the Van Pier, where passengers would travel to Tatvan via ferry, and the western half of the train would continue to Ankara.  As of mid-2015, freight trains are the only rail traffic at the station. However, as of September 2018, a twice weekly service to Tabriz is due to resume.

Van Pier station was opened in 1971 by the Turkish State Railways.

Images

See also
Edirne railway station - Opened in the same year, with the near-identical station buildings.

References

Railway stations in Van Province
Railway stations opened in 1971
1971 establishments in Turkey
Van, Turkey